Williford may refer to:

Williford, Patrick, Surname for the Williford family.
Williford, Arkansas, a town in Sharp County, Arkansas
Williford, Florida, an unincorporated community in Gilchrist County, Florida